The State Border Guard Service or VSAT is a border control institution under the Ministry of the Interior charged with controlling and maintaining the security of the Lithuanian borders on land, in the Baltic Sea and the Curonian Lagoon.

History

1920–1940

Following the declaration of independence on 16 February 1918, Lithuania had to ensure its border protection. This was a difficult task to fulfill, because the borders were changing (Lithuania took over the Klaipėda Region in 1923 and was in a perpetual dispute with Poland over the Vilnius Region), and the bodies protecting the border were changing as well (the customs and patrol guards, militia and army).

The formation of the first border regiment was started on 1 February 1920. On 26 January 1922, the Lithuanian defence minister, Jonas Šimkus, issued an order designating 29 June as Border Regiment Day. At that time, border regiments protected the border, and the State Border Police was formed in the Klaipėda Region on 18 June 1923. Later, border regiments, units of the Ministry of Defence, were disbanded, and the border police of the Ministry of the Interior took over the protection of the state border on 1 January 1924. Before the first Soviet occupation, the number of Lithuanian border police was not large: 1,656 policemen in 1931 and 1,934 in 1933.

This strength was maintained until June 1940 when the Soviet Union occupied Lithuania. After that, some border guards were subject to political persecution, the border police was disbanded, and the Red Army took control of the Lithuanian border with Nazi Germany. Near the end of World War II, the Soviets occupied Lithuania for the second time. Throughout their rule, they protected only the Lithuanian border with the People's Republic of Poland.

Struggle for independence 1990–1991

After Lithuania restored its independence on 11 March 1990, it had to ensure the protection and inviolability of its borders. By a resolution of 3 April 1990, the Supreme Council (Lithuanian parliament) assigned the Council of Ministers the task of establishing the Department of Defence thus initiating the formation of new state border guards. On 10 September 1990, the Government adopted a resolution with a view to forming services at the Ministry of Defence that were to ensure the economic protection of the Lithuanian borders. On 10 October 1990, the Government adopted a resolution to establish 61 border posts. These posts were to begin operation by 19 November, but due to lack of resources and personnel not all of them operated as intended.

Soviet security forces, mainly OMON, carried out a campaign against unarmed Lithuanian border guards: border guards' premises were burnt and wrecked, cars stolen and bombed, and guards were beaten and harassed. On 19 May 1991, Gintaras Žagunis, an officer at the Krakūnai border crossing point at the Lithuania–Belarus border, was shot dead while on duty. On 31 July 1991, seven Lithuanian officers were killed in Medininkai border point. The only survivor, Tomas Šernas, became disabled. The attacks on Lithuanian border posts continued until the attempted August Coup in Moscow on 23 August 1991.

From 1992
The Ministry of Defence issued an order by which the Frontier Guard Service was renamed as the State Border Guard Service, starting 6 August 1992. When the last Soviet soldier left Lithuania on 31 August 1993, the State Border Guard Service was already well established. On 18 July 1994, the Government adopted a resolution that restructured the State Border Guard Service at the Ministry of Defence into the Border Police Department at the Ministry of the Interior. As during the interwar period, guarding of the Lithuanian borders became the duty of a border police.

After the system of border guarding was restored, the legal status of the state border had to be defined and the border itself demarcated. The Treaty on Restoration of the State Border between Lithuania and Latvia was signed on 29 June 1993. It required a considerable diplomatic effort to conclude and sign a treaty on the state border with Belarus on 6 February 1995. A similar treaty was signed with Poland the same year. The treaty on delimitation of the state border between Lithuania and the Russian Federation was signed during a summit in Moscow on 24 October 1997.

The border police was re-structured in 1997, 2000 and on 22 February 2001, when the government decided to re-organise the Border Police Department into the State Border Guard Service at the Ministry of the Interior. When preparing for the re-organisation, a large number of legal acts were adopted which regulate the activity of the State Border Guard Service. Of these, the most prominent are the Law on the State Border Guard Service and the Law on the State Border and Protection Thereof. Prior to the re-organisation, the status of the Border Police Department and service in the border police were regulated by the laws on the police, on state service and others as well as by the Statute of Service in the System of the Interior. These legal acts were more about the general activity of the police. After the re-organisation was complete, the State Border Guard Service began to perform its border guard functions starting 1 May 2001.

Lithuania became a member of the European Union on 1 May 2004 and of the Schengen Area on 21 December 2007. The Lithuanian border with Kaliningrad Oblast (Russia) and Belarus became the external border of the EU and the Schengen Area. The passport control on the Latvian and Polish borders was eliminated while the checks on the Russian and Belarusian borders was strengthened.

Structure

Districts
VSAT is divided into the following districts:
 Vilnius Frontier District 
 Ignalina Frontier District 
 Varėna Frontier District 
 Pagėgiai Frontier District 
 Coast Guard District

Aviation unit
The Aviation Unit of the Lithuanian State Border Guard Service received new helicopters to patrol the European Union external border. Available aircraft in service:

Gallery

See also
Military of Lithuania
European Border and Coast Guard Agency

References

External links
 Official page of State Border Guard Service of Lithuania (English)

Border guards
Law enforcement agencies of Lithuania
Borders of Lithuania
1990 establishments in Lithuania
Ministry of the Interior (Lithuania)